Ondrej Spiegl (born 10 July 1993) is a Swedish figure skater. He is a two-time Nordic medalist (silver in 2017, bronze in 2015) and a two-time Swedish national champion.

Personal life 
Ondřej Spiegl was born on 10 July 1993 in either Salzburg, Austria, or Brno, Czech Republic. He is the son of Vera and Alan Spiegl, a former pair skater who competed with his sister, Ingrid Spieglová, for Czechoslovakia. He has a younger brother, Lukas, who also practiced figure skating.

After living in Austria and the Czech Republic, Spiegl moved with his family to Sweden at the age of seven years and later became a Swedish citizen. As of 2016, he is pursuing a master's degree in sports science at the Swedish School of Sport and Health Science in Stockholm.

Career 
Having begun learning to skate in Austria in 1996, Spiegl practiced in the Czech Republic from the age of five years and in Sweden from age seven. He debuted on the ISU Junior Grand Prix series in 2009 and placed 27th at the 2011 World Junior Championships in Gangneung, South Korea.

In October 2011, Spiegl competed for the first time on the senior level, at the 2011 Coupe Internationale de Nice, but he continued appearing on the junior level until the end of the 2012–13 season. He finished 28th at the 2013 World Junior Championships in Milan, Italy.

In the 2014–15 season, Spiegl won his first senior national title, ahead of Marcus Björk, and took the bronze medal at the 2015 Nordic Championships.

In 2015–16, Spiegl successfully defended his national title, outscoring Illya Solomin. He has undergone surgery on both of his knees.

Programs

Competitive highlights 
CS: Challenger Series; JGP: Junior Grand Prix

References

External links 

 

1993 births
Swedish male single skaters
Living people
People from Eskilstuna
Czech emigrants to Sweden
Naturalized citizens of Sweden
Competitors at the 2015 Winter Universiade
Competitors at the 2017 Winter Universiade